The  is a skyscraper in the Kohoku-ku ward of Yokohama, Japan. Completed in March 1992, it stands at 149.4 m (490 ft) tall. It is the 8th tallest building in Yokohama.

References

1992 establishments in Japan
Skyscrapers in Yokohama
Skyscraper hotels in Japan
Hotels established in 1992
Hotel buildings completed in 1992
Hotels in Yokohama